Two ships of the United States Navy have been named Bush, in honor of William Sharp Bush.

See also

References

United States Navy ship names